Gerberge of Lorraine (c. 935-978) was the daughter of Giselbert, Duke of Lorraine, and Gerberga of Saxony, daughter of Henry I the Fowler, King of Germany. She was a descendant of Charlemagne through both her parents. Gerberge died sometime after 7 September 978.

In or before 954, she married Adalbert I of Vermandois. Their children were:

 Herbert III of Vermandois
 Otto of Vermandois, perhaps identical to Otto I, Count of Chiny (–)
 Liudolfe of Vermandois, Bishop of Noyon and Tournai (–986)

References

Carolingian dynasty
Herbertien dynasty
Women from the Carolingian Empire
10th-century French nobility
10th-century French women
11th-century French nobility
11th-century French women
10th-century German nobility
10th-century German women
11th-century German nobility
11th-century German women
930s births
978 deaths
Year of birth uncertain